City View Junior/Senior High School is a 3A public secondary school in Wichita Falls, Texas, USA. It is part of the City View Independent School District located on the western edge of Wichita Falls and serves grades six through twelve.  In 2011, the school was rated "Academically Acceptable" by the Texas Education Agency.

In addition to sections of Wichita Falls, the school includes a portion of Pleasant Valley.

Athletics
The City View Mustangs compete in cross country, volleyball, football, basketball, power lifting, golf, tennis, track, softball, and baseball.

References

External links
City View Junior/Senior High School
City View ISD

Public middle schools in Texas
Schools in Wichita County, Texas
High schools in Wichita Falls, Texas
Public high schools in Texas